Oberne is a rural community in the eastern part of the Riverina.  It is situated about 10 kilometres north east of Humula and 18 kilometres south of Tarcutta.

Oberne Creek Post Office opened on 1 April 1916 and closed in 1968.

Notes and references

Towns in the Riverina
Towns in New South Wales